Battle of Kōnodai may refer to:
Battle of Kōnodai (1538)
Battle of Kōnodai (1564)